Emma Dyke (born 30 June 1995) is a New Zealand rower. She is a 2019 world champion winning the women's eight title at the 2019 World Rowing Championships.

Dyke won a silver medal at the 2015 World Rowing Championships with the women's eight, qualifying the boat for the 2016 Olympics. With the women's eight, she came fourth at the 2016 Rio Olympics. At the 2017 New Zealand rowing nationals at Lake Ruataniwha, she partnered with Grace Prendergast in the premier women's pair and they became national champions.

References

External links

Living people
1995 births
New Zealand female rowers
World Rowing Championships medalists for New Zealand
Rowers at the 2016 Summer Olympics
Olympic rowers of New Zealand
Sportspeople from Invercargill
People educated at Craighead Diocesan School
Rowers at the 2020 Summer Olympics
Medalists at the 2020 Summer Olympics
Olympic silver medalists for New Zealand
Olympic medalists in rowing
21st-century New Zealand women